Kamyk may refer to the following places in Poland:
 Kamyk, Lesser Poland Voivodeship (south Poland)
 Kamyk, Łódź Voivodeship (central Poland)
 Kamyk, Silesian Voivodeship (south Poland)

See also 
 Kamýk (disambiguation), several places in the Czech Republic